Croatia–Kosovo relations refer to the bilateral relations of Croatia and Kosovo. Diplomatic relations among two countries were established on 30 June 2008, following Kosovo's declaration of independence. Croatia has an embassy in Pristina, and Kosovo has an embassy in Zagreb. Both countries were part of Yugoslavia from 1918 to 1991. Relations between the two countries are described as very good and friendly.

Relations 
Croatia recognised Kosovo on 19 March 2008. The two countries established diplomatic relations on 30 June 2008. On 7 November 2008 Croatia upgraded its liaison office in Pristina to an embassy. On 19 February 2010 Kosovo opened its embassy in Zagreb. On 9 April 2015 Croatia and Kosovo signed a European partnership agreement that formalized the framework of their cooperation in the reform of Kosovo's institutions according to the European standards. Croatian and Kosovo state officials meet regularly. Croatia supported Kosovo at the International Court of Justice's oral debate on the legality of Kosovo's independence. On 27 September 2021 Croatian President Zoran Milanović supported Kosovo's dispute with Serbia over the new law that prohibited Serbian registered car plates to enter Kosovo without a having a temporarily Kosovo licensed car plate that would be registered upon its border with Serbia. Namely he said that: "Kosovo has responded with reciprocal measures to something Serbia has been doing for ten years. If you cannot go to Serbia with Kosovo license plates, then Kosovo can decide that the same applies to cars from Serbia,”.

Military 
On 15 July 2008 the Croatian Parliament approved Croatia's participation in the KFOR mission. Croatia sent the first contingent consisting of 20 soldiers and 2 Mil Mi-17 helicopters to Kosovo on 1 July 2009. On 25 September 2015 the Parliament decided that Croatia can send up to 35 soldiers and 2 helicopters to Kosovo. The basic task of the Croatian contingent is to transport KFOR forces, cargo, and VIPs.
As of 2019, Croatia has 34 troops serving in Kosovo, which is the 30th contingent so far.

4th Prime Minister of Kosovo Agim Çeku participated in the Croatian War of Independence as a brigadier in the Croatian Army. He regularly resides in Zadar where he was a professor at a local military school between 1984 and 1990.

People
Kosovo is home to a community of around 300 ethnic Croats concentrated in the villages of Janjevo (Janjevci), Šašare, Vrnavokolo and Vrnez. Their ancestors, Croat merchants and miners from Dubrovnik and Bosnia and Herzegovina, settled in the area rich in silver and lead mines in the 14th century. The number of Albanians in Croatia is much larger. According to 2011 census, 17,513 Albanians live in Croatia, mostly from Kosovo and Macedonia.

See also 
 Foreign relations of Croatia
 Foreign relations of Kosovo
 Croatia–Serbia relations

Notes

References

External links 
 Croatian Ministry of Foreign Affairs about relations with Kosovo

 
Kosovo
Bilateral relations of Kosovo